Mariana Fleitas Rieira, commonly known as Mariana Fleitas (born 6 March 1981)  is a team handball player from Uruguay who has played on the Uruguay women's national handball team. 

She participated at the 2003 World Women's Handball Championship in Croatia, the 2005 World Women's Handball Championship in Russia and the 2011 World Women's Handball Championship in Brazil.

References

1981 births
Living people
Uruguayan female handball players
Handball players at the 2003 Pan American Games
Handball players at the 2011 Pan American Games
Pan American Games medalists in handball
Pan American Games bronze medalists for Uruguay
Medalists at the 2003 Pan American Games
21st-century Uruguayan women